Ossington is a subway station on Line 2 Bloor–Danforth of the Toronto subway in Toronto, Ontario, Canada. It is located at Ossington Avenue just north of Bloor Street West and opened in 1966 as part of the original segment of the subway line. Wi-Fi service is available at this station.

Description

The main station entrance is on the west side of Ossington Avenue, just north of Bloor. In December 2016, elevators were installed at this station, thus making Ossington station a fully accessible station. There is a second automatic entrance, with entry only by Presto card, on Delaware Avenue, beside a TTC electrical substation.

As part of the 2016 renovation, the station acquired the artwork Ossington  Particles by Scott Eunson. The artwork uses 800 stick-on coloured acrylic tiles arranged in clusters near stairways on the platform and mezzanine levels. Plaques in the station provide an artist's message: "The Particles inhabit the tile grid of Ossington Station to tell a story of the natural and human history of this site, mapping the local Garrison Creek watershed and recalling the ancient landscape and geology of this neighborhood."

Surface connections

TTC routes serving the station include:

Easier access program 
In the summer of 2014, work has begun on the station to make it accessible to all customers. Improvements to the station include two new elevators to access the subway platforms, automatic sliding doors, barrier free access to the platform, security upgrades, and signage improvements.

References

External links

Line 2 Bloor–Danforth stations
Railway stations in Canada opened in 1966